Noah Lewis may refer to:

 Noah Lewis (musician), (1891–1961) American musician
 Noah Lewis (footballer), (born 2000) Dutch footballer